Diatraea saccharalis, the sugarcane borer, is a species of moth of the family Crambidae. It was described by Johan Christian Fabricius in 1794. It is native to the Caribbean, Central America, and the warmer parts of South America south to northern Argentina. It was introduced to Louisiana in about 1855, and has since spread to the other Gulf Coast states.

The wingspan is 18–28 mm for males and 27–39 mm.

The larvae are considered a pest on sugarcane and other crops such as corn, rice, sorghum and Sudangrass. Other food plants include Sorghum halepense, Paspalum, Panicum, Holcus and Andropogon.

Gallery

External links
 "Sugarcane borer Diatraea saccharalis (Fabricius)". Featured Creatures. University of Florida.

Chiloini
Moths described in 1794
Agricultural pest insects